The 2014 Women's LEN Super Cup was a water polo match organized by LEN and contested by the reigning champions of the two main European club competitions, the 2013–14 LEN Women's Champions' Cup and the 2013-14 Women's LEN Trophy.

Squads
The two squads were Olympiacos Piraeus and CN Sabadell Astralpool.

Olympiacos Piraeus

Head coach: Charis Pavlidis

CN Sabadell Astralpool

Head coach: Ignasi Guiu

References

Women's LEN Super Cup
2014 in water polo